Long Mio is one of the villages located in the district of Sipitang, Sabah. Majority of the inhabitants are of Lun Bawang/Lun Dayeh ethnic group.

Sipitang District
Villages in Sabah